TSG Balingen is a German football club from the city of Balingen, Baden-Württemberg. With over 1,800 members, it is the largest sports club in the city and has departments for athletics, basketball, fencing, fistball, gymnastics, handball, judo, and karate, as well as various personal health oriented programs.

In 2002 the first handball team merged with TV Weilstetten to HBW Balingen-Weilstetten. The team now plays in Handball-Bundesliga.



History
The origins of the club go back to the 19th century founding of a gymnastics club. The footballers first came to notice in the mid-90s with their advance to the Verbandsliga Württemberg (V) in 1995.

After twice finishing as vice-champions in the Verbandsliga and failing to win promotion to the Oberliga Baden-Württemberg (IV) in subsequent playoffs, TSG finally claimed the league title in 2008 and advanced to what has become a fifth tier competition following the introduction of the 3. Liga. They won the Oberliga Baden-Württemberg in 2018 to gain promotion to the Regionalliga Südwest.

Honours
 Oberliga Baden-Württemberg
 Champions: 2017–18
 Verbandsliga Württemberg
 Champions: 2007–08
 Runners-up: 2004–05, 2005–06

Current squad

Recent managers
Recent managers of the club:

Recent seasons
The recent season-by-season performance of the club:

 With the introduction of the Regionalligas in 1994 and the 3. Liga in 2008 as the new third tier, below the 2. Bundesliga, all leagues below dropped one tier.

Stadium
TSG plays in the Bizerba Arena which has a capacity of 8,500, including 600 covered seats.

References

External links
Official team site
TSG Balingen at Weltfussball.de

Football clubs in Germany
Football clubs in Baden-Württemberg
1848 establishments in Germany